Alessandro Carrera (born 1954 in Lodi, Lombardy) is an Italian poet and translator.
He is Director of Italian Studies and Graduate Director of World Cultures & Literatures at the University of Houston.

See also
Peter Carravetta

References

External links 
 Alessandro Carrera

1954 births
Living people
Italian poets
Italian translators
Italian literary critics
Literary theorists
University of Houston faculty
People from Lodi, Lombardy
Italian male poets
Date of birth missing (living people)